This article is a list of domestic and international non-governmental organisations operating in the People's Republic of Bangladesh.


A
 Academy for Educational Development
 Acid Survivors Foundation
 ActionAid, overcoming poverty
 Adventist Development and Relief Agency
 Association for Social Advancement

B
 BRAC (NGO)
 Bangladesh Rehabilitation Assistance Committee
 Bangladesh Rural Advancement Committee
 Bangladesh Red Crescent Society
 Bangladesh Rehabilitation Centre for Trauma Victims

C
 CAFOD, working through partner agency Action on Disability and Development
 Caritas Internationalis
 Carter Center, democracy, health
 Centre for Law and Mediation (Bangladesh)
 Centre for Policy Dialogue
 Childreach International
 Christian Commission for Development in Bangladesh
 CIRDAP

F
 The Fred Hollows Foundation, eye health
 Friendship (NGO)

H
 Habitat for Humanity (Habitat Bangladesh)
 Helen Keller International

N
 National Children's Task Force

O
 Odhikar, human rights
 Oxfam

P
Proshika, self-reliance for the poor

U
 UBINIG, Unnayan Bikalper Nitinirdharoni Gobeshona, research, policy, advocacy agency, opposes industrial agriculture

References

NGO Bangladesh